Louis I. Gladstone (May 22, 1927 – April 10, 2016) was an American politician from Connecticut.

Gladstone was born in 1927 in Bridgeport, Connecticut. He attended Central High School, the University of Bridgeport, University of Connecticut, and New York University Law School, earning a law degree at the latter. He is a member of the Connecticut Bar. He served in the United States Navy aboard the  during World War II. Gladstone served on the City Council of Bridgeport, first elected in 1955, serving as minority leader. He was elected to the state senate in 1958 while still serving on the Common Council, as president. In the state senate, he served on the Public Utilities Commission and Cities, Boroughs, Roads and Bridges Committee. During his time in the state senate he also served a term as majority leader. Gladstone also served as Comptroller of Connecticut from 1967 to 1970.

He married Joan Rockey and has three children, two daughters and a son. He was a member of the Jewish Community Center in Bridgeport. Gladstone died in 2016 at the age of 88.

References

1927 births
2016 deaths
Politicians from Bridgeport, Connecticut
University of Bridgeport alumni
University of Connecticut alumni
New York University School of Law alumni
Connecticut lawyers
Connecticut city council members
Democratic Party Connecticut state senators
Connecticut Comptrollers
20th-century American lawyers